Benjamin James Petty (22 March 1977) is an English former footballer who played in the Football League for Hull City and Stoke City.

Career
Petty was born in Solihull and started his career off in the youth ranks at Aston Villa. He failed to make the grade at Villa and move on to Brian Little's Stoke City in November 1998. He provided useful back-up in Stoke defence in 1998–99, making 13 appearances as Stoke missed out on the play-offs. Little left Stoke at the end of the season and in came Gary Megson who brought in his own players meaning that Petty was overlooked. After making just three appearances under Megson Petty forced his way back into the side once Guðjón Þórðarson took over in November 1999 and ended the 1999–2000 season with 19 appearances. He did play in five matches of Stoke's Football League Trophy winning run put failed to make the match day 16 in the final however Stoke lost in the play-offs to Gillingham. In 2000–01 Petty played in 34 matches for Stoke and scored his only senior goal in a 4–0 win over Walsall in the League Trophy. Stoke again reached the end-of-season play-offs where they faced Walsall. In the first leg both sides were cancelling each other out with Petty being brought on as a substitute. With the match into added time Walsall broke clear of City's defence and Petty 'sacrificed' himself bringing down the Walsall striker and was sent-off and the match ended 0–0. It was all in vain however as Stoke lost the second leg 4–2.

It proved to the last act in a Stoke shirt as he left for Hull City in July 2001. After a decent start with Hull, making 34 appearances in 2001–02 he fell out with manager Jan Mølby and Petty drifted into non-league football. He played for Stafford Rangers, Moor Green, Burton Albion and Redditch United before deciding to take up coaching. He worked as a coach for the Aston Villa Academy team until 2016, when he joined Leicester City's under 23's.

Career statistics
Source:

References

External links
 

1977 births
Living people
Sportspeople from Solihull
English footballers
Aston Villa F.C. players
Hull City A.F.C. players
Stoke City F.C. players
Burton Albion F.C. players
Stafford Rangers F.C. players
Moor Green F.C. players
Redditch United F.C. players
English Football League players
National League (English football) players
Aston Villa F.C. non-playing staff
Leicester City F.C. non-playing staff
Association football defenders